The women's 1500 m  at the 2009 KNSB Dutch Single Distance Championships in Heerenveen took place at Thialf on 2 November 2008. Although the championships were held in 2008 it is the 2009 edition as it was part of the 2008/2009 speed skating season. The top five speed skaters qualified for the 1500 m at the 2008–09 ISU Speed Skating World Cup. The title holder was Paulien van Deutekom.

Results

Final results 

Note:
PR = personal record

Source: KNSB.nl

Draw 

Source: KNSB.nl

References 

Dutch Single Distance Championships
Single Distance Championships
2009 Single Distance
World